Arcadia Mills No. 1, now the Arcadia Station Lofts, is a historic mill building at 1875 Hayne Street in Spartanburg, South Carolina.  The mill was built in 1903 and enlarged in 1909, to designs by Greenville J.E. Sirrine.  It is a well-preserved example of textile mill engineering from the early years of South Carolina's boom period in that industry.

The mill was listed on the National Register of Historic Places in 2014. It is now an apartment building.

See also
 National Register of Historic Places listings in Spartanburg County, South Carolina
 Arcadia Mill No. 2 also in Spartanburg, South Carolina

References

External links 
 Arcadia Station Lofts

Textile mills in South Carolina
Industrial buildings and structures on the National Register of Historic Places in South Carolina
Buildings and structures in Spartanburg, South Carolina
National Register of Historic Places in Spartanburg, South Carolina
Apartment buildings in South Carolina
Cotton mills in the United States